Christopher Lee McCarvill (born October 3, 1971) is an American musician best known as the touring and/or recording bass guitarist and backing vocalist with arena rock bands Dokken and House of Lords. He is well known for his energetic and technical virtuosity on the bass and his heartfelt vocal performances.

Biography
McCarvill was born and grew up in Milford, Connecticut. He began playing bass at age 12, his first instrument a Peavey Patriot bass guitar.

Upon graduation of High School, Chris attended and graduated the Musician's Institute's (MI) bass school (BIT) in Hollywood, California. He met songwriting partner and close friend Craig Polivka in Hollywood.

After graduating MI, McCarvill and Polivka met singer Jeff Scott Soto (ex Journey, Yngwie Malmsteen). Chris and Craig recorded and played several shows with Jeff and his band Slam in the early nineties. The band was short lived and the two returned to their native Connecticut.

In May 2011, Mr. McCarvill began teaching Bass at Route 1 Guitars in Milford, Connecticut.

1990s
Chris began doing session work in Boston as a bassist and also landed a full-time job as a graphic artist. He joined heavy metal band X Factor X, and continued to write with Polivka. During this time, Chris taught himself symphonic orchestration and developed his recording techniques, resulting in his renowned bass piece Demon Wheel.

2000-2004
Chris met vocalist Michael Vescera (Obsession, ex Loudness and Yngwie Malmsteen), and began recording bass on Mike's solo material as well as new Obsession music. He also created  album covers for several of Vescera's releases. Other musicians Chris met through Vescera were: BJ Zampa (drums), Jimi Bell (guitar) and Robert Marcello (guitar). McCarvill met Twisted Sister guitarist Eddie Ojeda, and began recording and playing live with Eddie's Band Of Steel with BJ Zampa and X Factor X vocalist Andre Vanchot. Chris was tapped by the Rockhouse Instructional Method Company to record a series of Instructional beginner DVDs and a “Slap and Pop” DVD. His bass DVD are top sellers worldwide. In addition to the heavier styles he is associated with, Chris began to develop a taste for recording punk inspired pop music, along with more progressive musical pieces.

2005-2009
Chris had a chance meeting with Soto in California. He subsequently toured Europe and South America with Soto's solo band. Soon after, McCarvill became a member of House of Lords, and began recording and touring Europe with Connecticut natives James Christian, BJ Zampa and Jimi Bell. In 2008, McCarvill was introduced to Dokken by his long-time friend Jim Paidas of Paidas Management to act as touring bassist for the band on their summer run with Poison and Sebastian Bach on the “Live, Raw and Uncut” tour. BJ Zampa was added on drums halfway through the summer. At the end of this tour Chris and BJ formed the Samurai Cab Company, with McCarvill on lead vocals and bass guitar. Chris also recorded a “masterwork” with BJ Zampa on drums called “Venus Supercharger”.

2010-2014
McCarvill and Zampa continued to tour and/or record with House of Lords. Big Money was released in 2011, Precious Metal in 2014, and Indestructible in 2015.

Obsession began recording and playing shows again, featuring Mike Vescera, BJ Zampa, Scott Boland, and X Factor X guitarist John Bruno. Eddie Ojeda was also recording new material with McCarvill, Zampa and Vanchot.

In addition to performing cover songs, The Samurai Cab Company started recording and performing original music featuring most of McCarvill's songwriting over the years. Their debut self-titled EP was released in August 2010 and sold out in just three weeks. The 4 songs are still available as digital downloads through online services. The band had written and begun recording new original songs for a planned full-length album. The Samurai Cab Company consists of Chris McCarvill, BJ Zampa, Chuck Beckman on guitar, and keyboardist Jeff Baryla.

In 2012, McCarvill recorded bass for Chris Bickley's Tapestry of Souls. Several other guest artists & vocalists are featured on the album, including Zampa and Vescera. McCarvill formed Maxx Explosion with Zampa, Beckman, and additional guitarist Jimi Bell. Maxx Explosion later consisted of just McCarvill, Zampa, and Bell.

By 2013, Maxx Explosion released their debut album Forever. The Samurai Cab Company was dissolved (Beckman went on to play in several other bands, including the Zaubi Acoustic Duo featuring Sharon Zaubi; Baryla pursued his solo project Demons Run, then later co-founded Hard Candy).

Obsession replaced McCarvill and Zampa with Jeff Curtiss and Yani Sofianos, respectively, in 2014.

2015-2022
Maxx Explosion continued to gain popularity and fans over the years. The band recorded and released their second album Dirty Angels in 2015. McCarvill writes most of the music, arrangements, and lyrics for Maxx Explosion. An early version of "Over You" (from Dirty Angels) was to be on The Samurai Cab Company full-length, which never came to fruition.

After several years as a touring member of Dokken, the band officially welcomed Chris McCarvill to the group (replacing Sean McNabb as their bassist) in 2015.

In 2018, Maxx Explosion added another member to their lineup. Mark Zito of Equinoxx joined as keyboardist.

On September 19, 2019 Maxx Explosion announced on their Facebook page that they're almost done writing new music, and they hope to start recording their third album soon.

Starting in mid-2022, the long-dormant Samurai Cab Company Facebook Page showed signs of activity. A new Profile Picture and Cover Photo was uploaded on May 23 featuring a re-designed logo. On June 1, a single cryptic post was made which only read: 'Coming Soon'. Then, after 6 months of silence, it was announced on December 2 that Samurai Cab Company was back. A music video of the newly re-formed band was shared. They performed a cover of "It's the Most Wonderful Time of the Year". The new lineup harkens back to the days of the original 3-piece, with McCarvill on lead vocals and bass, Beckman on guitar, and Tony Mei on drums.

Family
Chris is married to Leah, whom he met when he was 12. They have one son, Alexander, born in 2001. They reside in Plymouth, Connecticut.

Gear
To make his playing more efficient, he built “ramps” for his basses. He had noticed BIT instructor Gary Willis’ idea of fitting a block of wood under the strings so the instrument felt like playing an upright bass. With Chris’ double jointed thumbs, he came up with his own solution of completely covering the pickup area with thin plastic, which he found, did not affect the sound. McCarvill has built and used his own ramps on almost all of his basses since 1990.

After his favorite bass (a magenta Ibanez RD707) was stolen from a car in Hollywood in 1993, Chris started modifying his next bass to fit all of his criteria. His new orange Ibanez RD707 ended up with a custom made neck, different pickups, electronics and hardware. Chris wore this bass out over the next ten years. As this bass began to age, McCarvill began designing his own bass from the ground up and built it with the help of friend and machine shop owner Mark Clapp. The result was his green 2005 Magbass which is still one of his main instruments. He also uses a red and black neck-through Charvel 3B that he customized and painted himself.

Discography
With Michael Vescera:
 MVP: The Altar (2001)
 Safe Haven (2002)

With Obsession:
 Carnival of Lies (2006)
 Order of Chaos (2012)

With House of Lords:
 Come to My Kingdom – 2008 (Blistering/Frontiers)
 Cartesian Dreams (2009)
 Big Money (2011)
 Precious Metal (2014)
 Indestructible (2015)

With X Factor X:
 X Factor X (1997)
 KUVRS (2003)

With Eddie Ojeda:
 Axes 2 Axes (2004)

With The Samurai Cab Company:
 EP (2010)

With Chris Bickley
 Tapestry of Souls (2012)

In Maxx Explosion
 Forever (2013)
 Dirty Angels (2015)
 Untitled new album (2020/2021)

References

External links
 Official Chris McCarvill website

American rock bass guitarists
1971 births
Living people
House of Lords (band) members
Dokken members
People from Milford, Connecticut
People from Plymouth, Connecticut
American male bass guitarists
21st-century American bass guitarists
21st-century American male musicians